A Fingal County Council election was held in Ireland on 23 May 2014 as part of that year's local elections. Forty councillors were elected from a field of 97 candidates for a five-year term of office from five local electoral areas by proportional representation with a single transferable vote.

Fingal County Council was expanded from 24 seats to 40 in recognition of population growth. Fianna Fáil emerged as the largest party after the elections with 7 seats with 3 net gains and securing 2 seats in each of Castleknock and Swords. Fine Gael retained 6 seats though found themselves without representation in Swords while securing 2 in each of Castleknock and Howth-Malahide. Sinn Féin also secured 6 seats, including 2 seats in Mulhuddart. Labour had a very bad election winning just 4 seats and losing 5 seats as a whole as well as being wiped out in Castleknock. The Anti-Austerity Alliance also made 4 gains, including 2 seats in Mulhuddart, chiefly coming from their former base in the Socialist Party. The Green Party returned to the Council Chamber with 2 seats in each of Castleknock and Howth-Malahide. People Before Profit also secured a seat in the Balbriggan LEA. Independents were however the chief winners in Fingal gaining 8 additional seats to emerge after the elections with a total of 10 seats.

Results by party

Results by Electoral Area

Balbriggan

Castleknock

Howth-Malahide

Mulhuddart

Swords

References

Changes since 2014
† Following her victory in the 2014 Dublin West by-election Ruth Coppinger resigned her seat in accordance with the dual mandate. The vacancy was filled by her colleague, Matthew Waine, on 18 August 2014. 
†† Having failed to be selected as a candidate for Fianna Fáil at the Irish general election, 2016 David McGuinness resigned from the party citing class prejudice. 
††† On 29 May 2015 Anti-Austerity Alliance Cllr Annette Hughes resigned her seat for health reasons. Tania Doyle was selected to fill the vacancy and was co-opted at the Council's July meeting.
†††† On 24 September 2015 Howth-Malahide Independent Cllr Cian O'Callaghan joined the Social Democrats and was unveiled as a candidate for the party at the 2016 general election in the Dublin Bay-North constituency.
††††† Howth-Malahide Fine Gael Councillor Keith Redmond defected to Renua on 8 October 2015. He quit the party and became an Independent on 14 November 2016.
†††††† Following his election to the Dáil for Dublin West in the Irish general election, 2016, Jack Chambers resigned his seat in accordance with the dual mandate. Howard Mahony was co-opted to fill the vacancy on 15 March 2016.
††††††† Balbriggan Fine Gael Cllr J.P. Browne resigned his seat citing work commitments on 19 July 2016. Tom O'Leary was co-opted to fill the vacancy.
†††††††† Swords Independent Cllr Paul Mulville joined the Social Democrats on 28 August 2017.
††††††††† Balbriggan Independent Cllr David O'Connor resigned his seat to take up a position as President of Cricket Ireland. Cathal Boland was co-opted to fill the vacancy on 21 July 2018.
†††††††††† Balbriggan Labour Party Cllr Ken Farrell resigned his seat due to ill health. Robert O'Donoghue was co-opted to fill the vacancy on 21 July 2018.
††††††††††† Swords Sinn Féin Cllr Philip Lynam announced on 29 November 2018 that he will resign his seat at the December meeting for work reasons.

External links 
 

2014 Irish local elections
2014